Cayo Henrique Nascimento Ferreira (born 22 February 1999), commonly known as Cayo Tenório, is a Brazilian footballer who plays  as a right back for Boavista.

Career statistics

Club

References

1999 births
Living people
Brazilian footballers
Association football defenders
CR Vasco da Gama players
Azuriz Futebol Clube players
Footballers from Rio de Janeiro (city)